SVGV Higher Secondary School, or in its full name Sree Vijayananda Gurukula Vidyalaya Higher Secondary School, is a secondary school located at Kidangannoor in Aranmula, India.

Achievements
SVGV was the champions in both the sections of high school and higher secondary school at the 2015 Pathanamthitta District School Arts Festival.

Affiliation
The school is affiliated to the Kerala State syllabus.

See also
 Education in Pathanamthitta district
 List of schools in Pathanamthitta district

References

Aranmula
High schools and secondary schools in Kerala
Schools in Pathanamthitta district